
Year 209 BC was a year of the pre-Julian Roman calendar. At the time it was known as the Year of the Consulship of Verrucosus and Flaccus (or, less frequently, year 545 Ab urbe condita). The denomination 209 BC for this year has been used since the early medieval period, when the Anno Domini calendar era became the prevalent method in Europe for naming years.

Events 
 By place 
 Roman Republic 
 The Romans under Quintus Fabius Maximus Verrucosus capture Tarentum (modern Taranto), which the Carthaginian general Hannibal has held for three years.
 The Battle of Canusium is fought between Hannibal's Carthaginian army and a Roman force led by Marcus Claudius Marcellus. The battle is indecisive.
 From his headquarters at Tarraco (Tarragona), Publius Cornelius Scipio, the Roman commander in Spain, launches a combined military and naval assault on the Carthaginian headquarters at Carthago Nova (modern-day Cartagena). He successfully besieges and captures the city. In capturing this city, Scipio gains access to copious stores and supplies, Spanish hostages, the local silver mines, a splendid harbour and a base for an advance farther south.

 Seleucid Empire 
 The King of the Parthians, Arsaces II, is attacked by the Seleucid king Antiochus III, who takes Hecatompylos (southeast of the Caspian Sea), the Arsacid capital and Syrinx in Hyrcania. Antiochus III defeats Arsaces II at the Battle of Mount Labus and then forces Arsaces II to enter into an alliance with the Seleucids.

 Greece 
 As strategos of the Achaeans, the Greek general Philopoemen is responsible for turning the Achaean League into an aggressive military power. He builds up the League's military capability. The Achaean League's army and cavalry under Philopoemen then defeat the Aetolians on the Elean frontier.

 China 
Jiao, Lord of Wey is deposed by Emperor Qin Er Shi, marking the end of the state of Wei
In August, Chen Sheng and Wu Guang begin an uprising to oppose Qin
The rebels restore the monarchies of Chu, Qi, Yan, Zhao, Wei and (in 208) Han.
The Qin general Zhang Han defeats an invasion of Guanzhong by the rebel general Zhou Wen.
Wu Guang is killed by his own officers, and Zhang Han defeats Chen Sheng, who is killed by an attendant while in flight.
 Having helped to conquer Baiyue in northern Vietnam and southern China for the Qin Dynasty, the general Zhao Tuo uses the rebellions against the Qin to establish his own independent kingdom in Nanyue, and conquers the neighboring provinces of Guilin and Xiang. He declares himself King Wu of Nanyue.

 Central Asia 
 Modun khaan inherits Teoman's Hunnu confederations and founds the Xiongnu Empire. Modu's forces push into Northern China, threatening the Qin Empire and forcing them to further fortify the Great Wall.

Births

Deaths 
Touman, chanyu of the Xiongnu Empire. (Killed by his successor)

References